Aaram may refer to:

 Aaram, a trade name for Alprazolam
 Aaram (film), a 1951 Indian film
 Aaram, an old way of spelling Åram, a village in Sunnmøre, Norway